Jonathan Dufrasne (born 2 August 1987, Boussu, Hainault, Belgium) is a Belgian track cyclist. At the 2012 Summer Olympics, he competed in the Men's team pursuit for the national team.

References

Belgian male cyclists
Living people
Olympic cyclists of Belgium
Cyclists at the 2012 Summer Olympics
Belgian track cyclists
1987 births
Cyclists from Hainaut (province)
People from Boussu